Originally an archenemy of the X-Men in Marvel comic books, the supervillain Apocalypse has appeared in various forms of media, including animated television series, live-action films and video games, while merchandise of the character include toys and trading cards.

Television

 Apocalypse appears in X-Men: The Animated Series, voiced by John Colicos in the first four seasons and James Blendick in season five. This version is an immortal and invincible megalomaniac who seeks to purge the world of humanity and mutants before remaking it in his image and possesses the additional ability to enlarge himself. Throughout the series, he makes several attempts to instigate a war between humanity and mutants while his subordinate Mystique brainwashes select mutants to become his Horsemen, only to be foiled by the X-Men, Archangel, and a time-traveling Bishop and Cable throughout the first three seasons. In the four-part season four finale "Beyond Good and Evil", Cable destroys Apocalypse's Lazarus Chamber, the source of his immortality, but Apocalypse ends up in the Axis of Time and sets out to achieve godhood and destroy time. Despite being foiled by Professor X and the universe's most powerful psychics, Apocalypse ends up in the astral plane and eventually reincarnates himself in Fabian Cortez's body in season five.
 Apocalypse appears in X-Men: Evolution, voiced by David Kaye. This version was abandoned as a baby before he was found by Baal's tribe of bandits, named "En Sabah Nur", and grew up to become a powerful warrior. After the Pharaoh Rama-Tut learned of Nur's power and slaughtered the bandits, the latter's full powers manifested, leading to him killing Rama-Tut's forces, taking the name "Apocalypse", and taking the pharaoh's pyramid-like vessel and a device within it called the Eye of Ages. Using it to empower himself further, he intended to use it turn all humans on Earth into mutants, but was sealed in the vessel by his high priests for fear of his power. In the present, Apocalypse makes telepathic contact with Mesmero and tasks the latter with freeing him. Eventually, Mesmero succeeds, freeing Apocalypse, who fuses with the vessel's futuristic technology, converts Magneto, Professor X, Storm, and Mystique into his Horsemen, and re-sets about fulfilling his plan. Ultimately, the X-Men, the Brotherhood of Bayville, and S.H.I.E.L.D. join forces to stop him, free his thralls, and send him far from Earth.
 Apocalypse makes non-speaking cameo appearances in Wolverine and the X-Men.

Film
 A young En Sabah Nur appears in the post-credits scene of X-Men: Days of Future Past, portrayed by Brendan Pedder.
 En Sabah Nur / Apocalypse appears in X-Men: Apocalypse, portrayed by Oscar Isaac via a combination of extensive makeup and costuming coupled with a combination of practical and visual effects. This version emerged in prehistoric times and developed technology that allow him to live forever by transferring his essence into the bodies of others, especially mutants, whose abilities he amassed with each transference. Throughout history, he has been worshiped as various gods despite earning a reputation for destruction following in his wake. After transferring himself to a mutant with a healing factor, Apocalypse was betrayed and sealed underground by his followers. He remained in stasis until he is accidentally awakened in the 1980s. He recruits Storm, Psylocke, Angel and Magneto to serve as his Horsemen before setting out to create a world where only the strong survive, only to be foiled by Charles Xavier and his X-Men and killed by Jean Grey via the Phoenix Force.

Video games

 Apocalypse appears as a boss in Spider-Man and the X-Men in Arcade's Revenge.
 Apocalypse appears as a boss in X-Men. 
 Apocalypse appears as a boss in X-Men 2: Clone Wars.
 Apocalypse appears as an unlockable boss in X-Men: Gamesmaster's Legacy.
 Apocalypse appears in X-Men: Mutant Apocalypse. This version is secretly based on Genosha.
 Apocalypse appears as a boss in X-Men vs. Street Fighter, voiced by Lorne Kennedy.
 Apocalypse appears as a boss in Marvel Super Heroes vs. Street Fighter, voiced again by Lorne Kennedy.
 Apocalypse appears in the Game Boy Color version of X-Men: Mutant Academy.
 Apocalypse appears in X-Men: Reign of Apocalypse.
 Apocalypse makes a cameo appearance in X-Men: Next Dimension.
 Apocalypse makes a minor appearance at the end of X2: Wolverine's Revenge, voiced by Chris Smith.
 Apocalypse appears in X-Men: The Ravages of Apocalypse.
 Apocalypse makes a cameo appearance in X-Men Legends, voiced by Dan Hay.
 Apocalypse appears as the final boss of X-Men Legends II: Rise of Apocalypse, voiced by Richard McGonagle.
 Apocalypse appeared in a teaser trailer for Marvel Heroes.
 Apocalypse appears as a playable character in Marvel: Future Fight.
 Apocalypse appears as a playable character in Marvel Puzzle Quest.
 Apocalypse appears as a playable character in Marvel Contest of Champions.
 Apocalypse appears as a playable character in Marvel Strike Force.
 Apocalypse appears in Marvel Realm of Champions.
 Apocalypse appears in Marvel Snap.

See also
 List of Marvel Comics characters
 Bibliography of Apocalypse

References

External links
 
 Unofficial En Sabah Nur aka Apocalypse